The Inostrantsev Glacier (lednik Inostrantseva) is one of the major glaciers in Novaya Zemlya, Arkhangelsk Oblast, Russia. 

It was named after Russian geologist, member of the Russian Academy of Sciences and professor at St. Petersburg University Alexander Alexandrovich Inostrantsev (Александр Александрович Иностранцев) by Arctic explorer Georgy Sedov.

Geography 
The Inostrantsev Glacier is located on the western side of northern Severny Island of Novaya Zemlya. Flowing from the Severny Island ice cap, it is a roughly southeast-northwest oriented tidewater glacier and its front, where other three smaller tributary glaciers merge, has a width of over 3 km. Its terminus is at the Inostrantsev Bay (zaliv Inostrantseva) of the Barents Sea, a 14 km wide and 130 m deep fjord.

See also
List of glaciers in Europe
List of glaciers in Russia

Further reading
J. J. Zeeberg, Climate and Glacial History of the Novaya Zemlya Archipelago, Russian Arctic. Purdue University Press (January 1, 2002)

References

External links
Changes in glacier extent on north Novaya Zemlya

Glaciers of Russia
Novaya Zemlya